Braskereidfoss is a village in Våler Municipality in Innlandet county, Norway. The Norwegian National Road 2 and the Solørbanen railway line both run through the village.

Braskereidfoss Station lies along the Solørbanen railway line which is currently a freight-only railway line since 1994. This is the only operating station between Elverum Station in Elverum at the north end of the line and Kongsvinger Station in Kongsvinger at south end. This station is primarily used for the on-loading of lumber, used by the local forestry industry.

References

Våler, Innlandet
Villages in Innlandet